Stephen Gilman (1917 in Chicago – November 23, 1986 in Cambridge, Massachusetts) was an American Hispanist, known for his work on the 15th-century novel La Celestina.

Biography
Gilman studied at Princeton University under Américo Castro and received his doctorate in 1943 with the work  A critical analysis of the "Quijote apocrifo" of Alonso Fernández de Avellaneda  (published in Spanish: "Cervantes y Avellaneda. Estudio de una imitación", Mexico City 1951, Ann Arbor 1987). After 2 years of military service, he was a Princeton assistant professor from 1946 to 1948. He went to Ohio State University in Columbus, Ohio and was first an associate professor, then a full professor from 1950 to 1956. For the academic year 1950–1951 he was a Guggenheim Fellow. From 1957 until his retirement in 1985, he taught at Harvard University as a professor of Romance languages. In 1961 he was elected to the American Academy of Arts and Sciences.
 
Gilman was the son-in-law of Jorge Guillén and the brother-in-law of Claudio Guillén.

Selected publications
The Art of “La Celestina”, Madison 1956, Westport 1976 (Spanish: La Celestina. Arte y estructura, Madrid 1974, 1992)
Tiempos y formas temporales en el "Poema del Cid", Madrid 1961, 1969, Ann Arbor 1971, 1982
The tower as emblem. Chapter VIII, IX, XIX and XX of the “Chartreuse de Parme”, Frankfurt am Main 1967
The Spain of Fernando de Rojas. The intellectual and social landscape of “La Celestina”, Princeton 1972, 1976, 2015 e-book edition (Spanish: La España de Fernando de Rojas. Panorama intelectual y social de “La Celestina”, Madrid 1978)
Galdós and the art of the European novel 1867-1887, Princeton 1981, 2014 e-book edition
The novel according to Cervantes, Berkeley 1989

Further reading
Creation and re-creation. Experiments in literary form in early modern Spain. Studies in honor of Stephen Gilman, ed. by Ronald E. Surtz and Nora Weinerth, Newark, Del. 1983
Francisco Márquez Villanueva, "Stephen Gilman", in: Nueva Revista de Filología Hispánica 35, 1987, pp. 1–4

References

1917 births
1986 deaths
American Hispanists
Princeton University alumni
Ohio State University faculty
Harvard University faculty